Modal testing is the form of vibration testing  of an object whereby the natural (modal) frequencies, modal masses, modal damping ratios and mode shapes of the object under test are determined.

A modal test consists of an acquisition phase and an analysis phase. The complete process is often referred to as a Modal Analysis or Experimental Modal Analysis. 

There are several ways to do modal testing but impact hammer testing and shaker (vibration tester) testing are commonplace.  In both cases energy is supplied to the system with a known frequency content.  Where structural resonances occur there will be an amplification of the response, clearly seen in the response spectra.  Using the response spectra and force spectra, a transfer function can be obtained.  The transfer function (or frequency response function (FRF)) is often curve fitted to estimate the modal parameters; however, there are many methods of modal parameter estimation and it is the topic of much research.

Impact Hammer Modal Testing 

An ideal impact to a structure is a perfect impulse, which has an infinitely small duration, causing a constant amplitude in the frequency domain; this would result in all modes of vibration being excited with equal energy. The impact hammer test is designed to replicate this; however, in reality a hammer strike cannot last for an infinitely small duration, but has a known contact time.  The duration of the contact time directly influences the frequency content of the force, with a larger contact time causing a smaller range of bandwidth.  A load cell is attached to the end of the hammer to record the force.  Impact hammer testing is ideal for small light weight structures; however as the size of the structure increases issues can occur due to a poor signal-to-noise ratio.  This is common on large civil engineering structures.

Shaker Modal Testing 

A shaker is a device that excites the object or structure according to its amplified input signal. Several input signals are available for modal testing, but the sine sweep and random frequency vibration profiles are by far the most commonly used signals.

Small objects or structures can be attached directly to the shaker table.  With some types of shakers, an armature is often attached to the body to be tested by way of piano wire (pulling force) or stinger (Pushing force). When the signal is transmitted through the piano wire or the stinger, the object responds the same way as impact testing, by attenuating some and amplifying certain frequencies. These frequencies are measured as modal frequencies.  Usually a load cell is placed between the shaker and the structure to obtain the excitation force.

For large civil engineering structures much larger shakers are used, which can weigh 100kg and above and apply a force of many hundreds of newtons.  Several types of shakers are common: rotating mass shakers, electro-dynamic shakers, and electrohydraulic shakers.  For rotating mass shakers the force can be calculated from knowing the mass and the speed of rotation; for the electro-dynamic shaker the force can be obtained through a load cell, or an accelerometer placed on the moving mass of the shaker.  Shakers can have an advantage over the impact hammer as they can supply more energy to a structure over a longer period of time.  However, problems can also be introduced; shakers can influence the dynamic properties of the structure and can also increase the complexity of analysis due to windowing errors.

See also
Modal Analysis
Vibration
Cushioning
Shock absorber
Shock (mechanics)
Shock response spectrum
Shaker (testing device)

References

Wave mechanics
Tests
de:Modalanalyse